Todd Strange (born June 26, 1966) is an American musician who is the bass guitarist for sludge metal band Crowbar. He also toured with Down and performed live in support of their debut album, NOLA.

Career 
Strange formed Crowbar with Kirk Windstein (Down), Matt Thomas, and Craig Nunenmacher (Black Label Society). They released the best-selling albums of the band's discography, including the self-titled LP with the songs "All I Had (I Gave)", "Existence is Punishment", "No Quarter" (by Led Zeppelin), and "I Have Failed", produced by Phil Anselmo. By 1994, Anselmo put his band Pantera to the side and resurrected Down which was sidelined for Pantera in the late 1990s. The band released NOLA in reference to the band's hometown, New Orleans, Louisiana, and played 13 shows. Eventually, the album sold 500,000 copies and was certified Gold by the RIAA. Soon after, Anselmo returned to Pantera while Crowbar continued, and the two bands partnered up for tours in 1996. As a result, Strange, Windstein, and the rest of Crowbar appear in Pantera's "Home Videos 3" in the credits, and Windstein and the band are seen in scenes including the clip of Windstein dressed up as the Hulk. This event is also included in Crowbar's 1996 home video "Like Broken", but contains slightly different footage.

By the time Down reformed and Crowbar recorded "Sonic Excess in its Purest Form", Strange dropped completely out of music. For several years afterwards, he worked as a machine repair tech in River Ridge, Louisiana.

In June 2016, after Crowbar's bassist Jeff Golden was fired from Crowbar, Windstein announced Strange's return to the band.

In 2018, Strange took a break from Crowbar to focus on spending more time with his family, though he is still a band member for Crowbar. Shane Wesley has filled in for Todd as a substitute bass player for the band.

Personal life 
Strange is married to Tessa Terror from the band Tricounty Terror and resides in Dallas, Texas.

Discography

Crowbar albums

Down albums

Music videos
1991 Crowbar – "Subversion"
1993 Crowbar – "All I Had (I Gave)"
1993 Crowbar – "Existence Is Punishment"
1994 Down – "Stone the Crow"
1995 Crowbar – "The Only Factor"
1996 Crowbar – "Like Broken" (home video)
1996 Crowbar – "Broken Glass"
1997 Pantera – "Home Video 3" (home video)

References and links
Crowbar official website (archived)

1966 births
Musicians from New Orleans
Living people
American heavy metal bass guitarists
American male bass guitarists
People from River Ridge, Louisiana
Guitarists from Louisiana
20th-century American guitarists
Down (band) members
Crowbar (American band) members